Sašo Jereb (born 20 January 1983 in Žiri) is a Slovenian judoka, who competed in the men's lightweight category. He represented his nation Slovenia at the 2004 Summer Olympics, and also held five Slovenian championship titles to his career hardware in the 73-kg division. Throughout his sporting career, Jereb trained full-time for the Olympic Judo Club in Ljubljana.

Jereb qualified for the Slovenian squad, as a lone male judoka, in the men's lightweight class (73 kg) at the 2004 Summer Olympics in Athens, by placing seventh and receiving a berth from the European Championships in Bucharest, Romania. He lost his opening match to Iranian judoka Hamed Malekmohammadi, who successfully scored an ippon and an uchi mata gaeshi (inner thigh counter), at three minutes and twenty-eight seconds.

References

External links
 

1983 births
Living people
Slovenian male judoka
Olympic judoka of Slovenia
Judoka at the 2004 Summer Olympics
People from Žiri
21st-century Slovenian people